Jacques Stosskopf (27 November 1898 – 1 September 1944) held the post of deputy director of naval construction at the German-held Lorient U-boat arsenal, but was a member of the French Resistance and war hero killed by the Nazis.

Military career 

Born in Paris on 27 November 1898, Jacques Stosskopf was of Alsatian origin and spoke fluent German. Mobilized in 1917 as an officer in the French artillery, he was awarded the Croix de Guerre. Stosskopf was admitted to the École polytechnique in 1920 and became a marine engineer in 1924. As a naval construction specialist, he was appointed in 1939 as head of the new construction unit at the Lorient arsenal and promoted to the rank of Chief Engineer, 1st Class.

Resistance hero 

In June 1940, the base fell under control of the German Kriegsmarine, who used it to repair and resupply their U-boats. Beginning in September 1940, Stosskopf pretended to collaborate with the Germans, using his position to inform Allied forces of submarine movements at Lorient. Stosskopf was denounced under torture by a captured agent of the Alliance network within the French Resistance. He was arrested by the Gestapo in February 1944, but many French believed that the Germans had promoted him.

The reality was quite different: Stosskopf was tortured by the Gestapo and deported under the Nacht und Nebel programme. He was executed at Struthof camp in Alsace on 1 September 1944, just before the arrival of the Allies. Stosskopf was posthumously awarded the Legion of Honour in August 1945, astonishing those who had believed that he was a traitor. The submarine base at Lorient was renamed in his honour in July 1946 as Base Ingénieur Général Stosskopf.

References

French Resistance members
French civilians killed in World War II
Commandeurs of the Légion d'honneur
Recipients of the Croix de Guerre 1914–1918 (France)
École Polytechnique alumni
Engineers from Paris
1898 births
1944 deaths
French people executed by Nazi Germany